Pauline Cahill (born 20 October 1929)  is a Paralympic lawn bowls competitor from  Australia.  She won a bronze medal at the 1996 Atlanta Games in the Women's Singles LB3–5 event.

References

Paralympic lawn bowls players of Australia
Lawn bowls players at the 1996 Summer Paralympics
Paralympic bronze medalists for Australia
Possibly living people
Medalists at the 1996 Summer Paralympics
1929 births
Australian female bowls players
Paralympic medalists in lawn bowls
20th-century Australian women